Sha Po Lang is a collective term for three stars in Chinese astrology used in the Zi wei dou shu 紫微斗數 method of fortune-telling.

The three stars are:
 Qi Sha, equivalent to Polis, symbolising power
 Po Jun, equivalent to Alkaid, symbolising destruction
 Tan Lang, equivalent to Dubhe, symbolising lust.

Chinese astrology
Stellar groupings

Sha Po Lang is also the title of the Chinese danmei novel by Priest.